Marita Hird (born 25 February 1971)  is a Paralympic equestrian competitor from Australia.  She won a bronze medal at the 2000 Sydney Games in the Mixed Dressage – Freestyle grade III event.

Personal
Hird was born in Kew, Victoria. She was a jockey until 1993 when she fell from her horse during a race. Hird broke her neck in three places and was advised that she was an incomplete quadriplegic. However, after nine months Hird learned to walk again and began riding horses as a form of therapy.

Sporting career
After being encouraged to compete in dressage, Hird won bronze at the World Championships in Aarhus Denmark. She went on to win bronze in the Mixed Dressage - Freestyle grade III event at the 2000 Paralympics in Sydney. Hird also represented Australia at the 2004 Paralympics where she just missed out on a medal. At the 2006 Pacific Rim Championships, held in Vancouver, Hird won three silver medals. She credits some of her success to Manolo Mendez, who gave her guidance.

References

External links 
 

1971 births
Living people
Australian female equestrians
Paralympic equestrians of Australia
Paralympic bronze medalists for Australia
Paralympic medalists in equestrian
Equestrians at the 2000 Summer Paralympics
Medalists at the 2000 Summer Paralympics
People from Kew, Victoria
Sportspeople from Melbourne
Sportswomen from Victoria (Australia)